The Andhra Pradesh State Department of Archaeology and Museums is a department of the Government of Andhra Pradesh which oversees archaeological exploration and maintenance of heritage sites and museums in the Indian state of Andhra Pradesh. It was established in the year 1914 under the stewardship of Dr. Gulam Yazdani. As a result of formation of A. P. State in 1956, the Department of Archaeology and Museums, Hyderabad was expanded and it became known as Andhra Pradesh Department of Archaeology and Museums in the year 1960. When the state of Telangana was formed in 2014, the department was separated into two; leading to disputes between the two newly formed departments over historical artifacts.

Museums 
Andhra Pradesh Department of Archeology and Museums has 13 museums across the state.

 Visakhapatnam Coastal Archaeological Govt. Museum, Visakhapatnam
 Andhra Sahitya Parishad Govt. Museum and Research Institute, Kakinada
 Sri Rallabandi Subbarao Archaeological Govt. Museum, Rajahmundry
 Bapu Museum, Vijayawada
 Baudhasree Archaeological Museum, Guntur
 Kalachakra Museum, Amaravati
 District Archaeological Site Museum, Chandavaram, Prakasam District
 Sri Tanguturi Prakasam Panthulu Memorial Government Site Museum, Kanaparthi, Prakasam District
 District Archaeological Museum, Nellore
 Bhagwan Mahavir Government Museum, Kadapa
 Dam Site Museum, Mylavaram, Kadapa district.
 District Archaeological Museum, Kurnool
 Padmasree Kalluri Subba Rao Archaeological Museum, Ananthapuram

See also 
 Archaeological Survey of India
 Amaravathi Mahachaitya
 Culture of Hyderabad

References 

1914 establishments in India
Archaeological organizations
Government departments of Andhra Pradesh
History organisations based in India
Ministries established in 1914
Andhra Pradesh